The Ministry of State Security is the Transnistrian state security service.

History 
It was formed May 16, 1992 and was headed by Vladimir Antyufeyev up to 2012, until he was replaced by Vladislav Finagin. The ministry is headquartered in Tiraspol. Until January 11, 2017, it was known as the Committee of State Security of the PMR, which was named after the former Soviet KGB.

The headquarters of the ministry were attacked in 2022 while the Russian invasion of Ukraine was taking place. This was part of a series of attacks of unknown authorship that occurred in Transnistria in that year. The perpetrator is unknown, but it is possible that it was a false flag incident orchestrated by Russia or Transnistria.

Structure 
 Territorial security agencies
 Security forces of the Armed Forces of Transnistria
 Service bodies within the ministry
 Support units
 Independent Battalion of Special Operations "Delta"
 Border Detachment
 Separate Reserve Cossack Border Regiment
 Center for Special Operations

Border Detachment 
The Border Detachment of the MGB tasked with patrol of the regional borders with Moldova and Ukraine. On 14 November 1992, former territorial rescue detachment fighters took the role of protecting of the borders of the republic, along with the Black Sea Cossacks. On 1 March 1993, in the structure of the Ministry of State Security, a reserve cossack regiment was created. The border detachment was formed in September 1993 from the Black Sea Cossacks and soldiers of the TSO. On 14 September 1993, the Border Guard received a battle banner. Today, there are two Cossack border commandant's offices, units of which more than 75% of the personnel are Cossacks.

The border outpost in Bender is named after the Cossack Colonel Driglov, who died defending the during the Transnistria War. Border Guards Day is celebrated on 14 September.

Independent Battalion of Special Operations "Delta" 
The Order of Honor Independent Battalion of Special Operations "Delta" of the Ministry of State Security is a special battalion formed on 31 March 1992 by presidential decree of Igor Smirnov, at the height of the Transnistria War. It is currently subordinate directly to the MGB, and is enlisted in the reserve of the Commander-in-Chief of the Armed Forces, it currently performs tasks of protecting the national border and fight against terrorism.

In late June of that year, the Delta battalion took part in the Battle in Bender, driving the forces of the Moldovan National Army from the bridge over the Dnister River. On 4 April 1997, the Delta Battalion was awarded the Order of Honor by President Yevgeny Shevchuk. In 2012, the "Delta" battalion was reorganized into the "East" Special Operations Center of the KGB.

List of leaders 
 Vladimir Antyufeyev – September 1992 – December 2011
 Vladislav Finagin – January 24, 2012 – May 17, 2013
 Nikolay Zemstov – October 22, 2013 – May 21, 2014
 Mikhail Lapitsky – May 21, 2014 – June 1, 2017
 Valeriy Gebos - June 1, 2017 – present

References

External links
 Description and contact information, Ministry of National Security of the Pridnestrovian Moldavian Republic, Retrieved April 2, 2010.
 Dan Ionescu, "Intelligence Agences: Lethal Expansion", TOL, 2002
 crij.org: Sorin Ozon, "Original Communism", Romanian Center for Investigative Journalism, July 13, 2006

History of Transnistria since 1991
Intelligence ministries
Politics of Transnistria
Political organizations based in Transnistria
Military of Transnistria